The 2018–19 Y-League season (also known as the 2018–19 Foxtel Y-League season for sponsorship reasons) was the eleventh season of the Australian Y-League, the premier national competition for youth football in the country.

Teams
The competition featured the same ten teams as the previous season:

Conference A
Conference A contains teams from outside of New South Wales and the Australian Capital Territory.

Conference B
Conference B contains teams from New South Wales and the Australian Capital Territory.

Managerial changes

Standings

Results

Positions by round

Fixtures
The season fixtures were announced on 22 October 2018.

Conference A
Round 1

Round 2

Round 3

Round 4

Round 5

Round 6

Round 7

Round 8

Round 9

Round 10

Conference B
Round 1

Round 2

Round 3

Round 4

Round 5

Round 6

Round 7

Round 8

Round 9

Round 10

Grand Final

Season statistics

Scoring

Top scorers

Hat-tricks

Clean sheets

Discipline

Player 
 Most yellow cards: 3 –  Joshua Varga (Melbourne City Youth)
 Most red cards: 1 (seven players)

See also
2018–19 A-League
2018–19 W-League

References

External links
Official Y-League website

2018–19 A-League season
A-League National Youth League seasons
2018 in Australian soccer
2019 in Australian soccer